Double You are an Italian Eurodance group founded in 1985 by vocalist William Naraine, keyboardist and producer Franco Amato and DJ Andrea de Antoni. By 1992, they had sold more than three million records. "Please Don't Go", a dance version of KC & the Sunshine Band's 1979 ballad, is one of their major hits.

Since 2013, they have been fronted by Naraine, Gino Martini, Gustavo Filipovich, Paulo Soveral and Missaka.

History

1990s
Double You formed in La Spezia. In 1991, they met with the producer Roberto Zanetti, who agreed on recording the band. In January 1992, "Please Don't Go", a dance version of the KC and the Sunshine Band song, was released, earning many gold and platinum records in Europe, Latin America, Africa and Asia. The record also sold in North America (top ten maxi sales), Israel (#12) and in the UK (#2 on the Cool Cuts Chart)

The second single, "We All Need Love" (cover of Canadian artist Domenic Troiano from 1979) was recorded in June 1992 during a European tour and charted around the world. After this second single, their debut album We All Need Love followed, which put together songs such as "Who's Fooling Who" (cover of a One Way song and the third single) and "Why (Let's Make It Christmas)". They performed the latter together with the original composer and singer of "Please Don't Go", Harry Casey, professionally known as "KC".

At the end of 1993, the recording of the second album, the Blue Album, started. These singles followed: "Missing You", "Part Time Lover", "Heart of Glass" and "Run to Me" (the song gave the group the possibility of starting their first tour in North America in 1995). They performed in such cities as Miami, Daytona, Orlando and other towns along the east coast.

The group performed in theatres and concert halls in Brazil, such as the Metropolitan in Rio de Janeiro and Olympia in São Paulo. In less than three months, the group performed 64 shows, attended by more than 350,000 people.

In 1995, a new single, "Dancing with an Angel" was released, featuring singer Sandra Chambers. A long Italian tour began, lasting eight months. The song was also a success in other countries such as Switzerland, Australia, Israel and Latin America. Another single, "Because I'm Loving You", was released in different versions. It was a big hit in Spain, Italy, Israel (where it reached No. 1) and Brazil and one of the most aired on European radios.

At the beginning of 1996, Andrea de Antoni left the group to undertake his own artistic career. In this period, Double You was in great demand in Brazil, so the new tour started. There they performed in the most important concert halls of the country. The group dedicated the album Forever to all their Brazilian fans. Half of this new album was produced in Italy and the rest in Brazil. It was released only in that country, selling 150,000 copies.

A single was released in the same year in Brazil only, under the label Spotlight, entitled "If You Say Goodbye".

William Naraine also took part in several DWA projects: Data Drama, Eclipse, Mission, Funkelectra, Infinity feat. Sense, Kaas, Pacific, Space Tribe, Time Machine, Toro, and Willy Morales. After a two-year rest and spending time in the studio to create new songs for their next album, in spring 1997, the new single "Somebody" was released. In 1999, another single was released, called "Desperado".

2000s
In 2000, Double You released a track called "Music (Is the Answer)" followed by a 2001 remix of the hit "Please Don't Go". A best of album called Studio Live was released the same year in Brazil. In 2002, Double You released a single entitled "Dance Anymore". He had worked with Memi P. and Ryo S., and produced and performed with other bands such as T-Factory. The same year, his voice was featured by Love Solution for the track "I'll Be over You".

In 2003, Double You did a remake of the Bryan Adams hit "(Everything I Do) I Do It for You", and a cover of U2's "With or Without You" (which was not released as a single). The band toured in all the main Brazilian cities. In May, they did shows in the South and Southeast, including both a presentation at the Olympia of São Paulo and their playing at the Caipiriba Dance, in the city of Aparecida. Then they went to Belém, Macapá and Manaus.

In March 2004, William Naraine contributed to Vanni G's single "All My Illusion". In October, he appeared once again on the next single "I Say Yeah". He also took part on a remix of the single by Promise Land vs Netzwerk Memories, where he made a duet with Sandy. In 2005, Double You released with artist Don Cartel "Please Don't Go 2005" on Triple B Records. The single hit the Dutch Mega Top 100 chart at No. 40 and the Pepsi Chart at No. 38. In November 2007, a live DVD (shot during a concert in São Paulo) and a live CD were released, available in Brazil only.

Discography

Studio albums

Compilations

Remix albums

Live albums

Singles

Promotional singles

Collaborations

See also 
List of Eurodance artists

References

External links
DWA Records 
Double You on Last.FM

Musical groups established in 1985
Italian Eurodance groups
Italian dance music groups
1985 establishments in Italy